Gregory Lee Best (born January 14, 1960) is a former American football defensive back who played in the National Football League (NFL) with the Pittsburgh Steelers and the Cleveland Browns.

Early life
Best  was born in New Brighton, Pennsylvania and attended Blackhawk High School in nearby Beaver Falls, Pennsylvania.  He was named second-team All-Conference in football as a junior and first-team All-Conference his senior year.

College Football
He  matriculated at Kansas State where he walked on to the football team as a wide receiver.  He became a four-year starter as a cornerback and kickoff returner, although he redshirted his sophomore season due to injury.  As a senior in 1982, Best was named to the All-Big Eight Conference team.

He was invited to play in the Blue–Gray Football Classic all-star game following his senior season in 1982.  He caught two interceptions in the game and was named the game's defensive MVP.

Professional Football
Best went undrafted in the 1983 NFL Draft, but was signed shortly after the draft by the Pittsburgh Steelers.  He spent training camp with the team, but was among the final roster cuts.  The Steelers re-signed Best after the third game of the 1983 season when Eric Williams was placed on the injured reserve list due to an ankle injury.

He played primarily as a special teamer with the Steelers with occasional reps at safety in passing situations.  Best's finest performance as a pro came in week seven of 1983 against the rival Cleveland Browns.  In that game Best made three tackles in the kicking game, caused an incompletion with a hit on Ozzie Newsome on defense and returned a fumble 94 yards for the game's final score.  That 94-yard fumble recovery return was the longest of the season in the NFL.

Best was once again released by the Steelers prior to the 1984 season.  He was picked up by the Browns, for whom he played five games in 1984.  He later signed with the Memphis Showboats of the United States Football League (USFL), but the league folded before he had a chance to play.  His bad luck continued when he signed with the Montreal Alouettes of the Canadian Football League only to see that team also fold before he could join them.

Best finished his playing career in 1988 after stints with the Pittsburgh Gladiators and the New York Knights of the Arena Football League.

Post-football career
Since leaving football, Best has worked as a general contractor.  He has also had an ownership interest in a sports bar in Cranberry Township, Pennsylvania.

Personal
Best married Donna Wickline in 1982.  They have since divorced.

References

1960 births
People from New Brighton, Pennsylvania
Players of American football from Pennsylvania
American football defensive backs
Kansas State Wildcats football players
Pittsburgh Steelers players
Cleveland Browns players
Pittsburgh Gladiators players
Living people
New York Knights (arena football) players